ADP-ribosylation factor GTPase-activating protein 1 is an enzyme that in humans is encoded by the ARFGAP1 gene.  Two transcript variants encoding different isoforms have been found for this gene.

Function 

The protein encoded by this gene is a GTPase-activating protein (GAP) which associates with the Golgi apparatus and which interacts with ADP-ribosylation factor 1 (ARF1). The encoded protein promotes hydrolysis of ARF1-bound GTP and is required for the dissociation of coat proteins from Golgi-derived membranes and vesicles. Dissociation of the coat proteins is required for the fusion of these vesicles with target compartments. The activity of this protein is stimulated by phosphoinositides and inhibited by phosphatidylcholine.

The protein has two amphipathic lipid packing sensor motifs (ALPS), that let the protein sense the curvature of the membrane (<30 nm) or lipid packing defects, and in this way evaluate if the vesicle is mature and ready for coat disassembly.

Interactions 

ARFGAP1 has been shown to interact with KDELR1 and LRRK2.

References

External links

Further reading